The Academic Staff Union of Universities (ASUU) is a Nigerian union of university academic staff, founded in 1978. ASUU is an offshoot of the Nigerian Association of University Teachers (NAUT) which was established in 1965. At that time, NAUT consisted of only five universities in total including University of Ibadan, University of Nigeria, Nsukka, Ahmadu Bello University, Zaria, University of Ife and University of Lagos. Professor Victor Emmanuel Osodeke emerged as the body's president on 30 May 2021.

After 234 days (33 weeks) of strike action by ASUU, the Federal Government of Nigeria on Thursday, October 05, 2022 announced the formation of two new academic unions - the National Association of Medical and Dental Academics (NAMDA) and the Congress of Nigerian University Academics (CONUA). ASUU eventually called off the 8-month strike on October 14, 2022.

Foundation
As a successor to the Nigerian Association of University Teachers that was founded in 1965, ASUU was formed in 1978 to cater for the interests of all academic staff in Federal and State universities in Nigeria.

Leadership of ASUU 
Professor Osodeke, a professor of Soil Science, at the Federal University of Agriculture, Umudike, Abia State, was elected on 30th May, 2021 during a three-day conference of the union which held at the Nnamdi Azikiwe University, Awka, Anambra State.

He took over from Biodun Ogunyemi, a professor of education at the Olabisi Onabanjo University, Ago-Iwoye, Ogun State.

ASUU strikes

Military regime
The Union was active in struggles against the military regime during the 1980s.
In 1988 the union organized a National Strike to obtain fair wages and university autonomy. As a result, the ASUU was proscribed on 7 August 1988 and all its property seized. It was allowed to resume in 1990, but after another strike was again banned on 23 August 1992. However, an agreement was reached on 3 September 1992 that met several of the union's demands including the right of workers to collective bargaining. The ASUU organized further strikes in 1994 and 1996, protesting against the dismissal of staff by the Sani Abacha military regime.

Fourth Republic
After the return to democracy in 1999 with the Nigerian Fourth Republic, the union continued to be firm in demanding the rights of university workers against opposition by the government of President Olusegun Obasanjo.
In July 2002 Dr. Oladipo Fashina, the then national president of the union, petitioned Justice Mustapha Akanbi of the Independent Corrupt Practices Commission to investigate the authorities of the University of Ilorin for financial mismanagement and corruption.

In 2007, the ASUU went on strike for three months.
In May 2008, it held two one-week "warning strikes" to press a range of demands, including an improved salary scheme and reinstatement of 49 lecturers who were dismissed many years earlier.
In June 2009, ASUU ordered its members in federal and state universities nationwide to proceed on an indefinite strike over disagreements with the Federal Government on an agreement it reached with the union about two and a half years earlier.
After three months of strikes, in October 2009, the union and other staff unions signed a memorandum of understanding with the government and called off the industrial action. On 1 July 2013, ASUU embarked on another strike which lasted 5 months and 15 days was called off on 16 December 2013. Claims made by ASUU in regards to the strike are centered largely on funding and revitalization of Nigerian public universities as well as a certain earned allowance which it claims to be in an arrears of 92 billion naira. Some Nigerian students said that the strike was a curse to them while others said it was a blessing before the ASUU strike was called.

In 2022, ASUU declared a one-month strike, beginning February 14, 2022. Some of the lecturer's demands include the revitalisation of public universities, earned allowance, improved funding of state universities, and promotion arrears. On March 7, 2022, Minister of Education, Adamu Adamu inaugurated a committee to renegotiate 2009 agreement with ASUU. The seven-man panel has Prof. Emeritus Nimi Briggs, Pro-Chancellor of Alex Ekwueme Federal University (AEFU), Ndufu-Alike Ikwo, as chairman. On March 14, ASUU extended the strike by 8 more weeks. The Federal Government eventually met ASUU on April 11, 2022, exactly 56 days since the commencement of the strike. On May 9, ASUU extended the strike by additional 12 weeks, and the strike reached six months without resolution, making it one of the longest ASUU strikes in history. On August 1, 2022, ASUU extended the strike by another four weeks. The FG met ASUU on August 16, 2022, to continue negotiations, with ASUU promising to suspend the strike if its demands were met, but the meeting ended in deadlock. ASUU subsequently said it would begin consultation on the next line of action. ASUU local chapters at ABU, BUK, UDUS, OAU voted for continuation and declaration of an indefinite strike in response to government's offer. State universities such as Benue State University, TASUED, Adekunle Ajasin University, Kano State University of Technology have also insisted on prosecuting the strike to its logical conclusion.

ASUU strike chart (1999–2022)

Origin of incessant strikes
These strikes are in response to  the Nigerian Government's refusal to uphold the agreement signed. It is a move by the union to force the government into a response. However, this has only yielded negative results. Luckily the strike of 2022 has ended but salaries still need to be paid and how many months will they pay.

Impact of strikes on students and stakeholders
While the association continues to claim that it is involved in a struggle for Nigerian tertiary education and Nigerian students by extension, many Nigerians perceive the supposed struggle, marked by incessant strike actions, to be malicious and self serving. This image has not been helped by ASUU, who still cannot communicate effectively with the Nigerian populace without sounding arrogant and condescending.

References

Tertiary education trade unions
Trade unions in Nigeria
Education in Nigeria
Trade unions established in 1978
1978 establishments in Nigeria